Sylvania is an unincorporated community in Liberty Township, Parke County, in the U.S. state of Indiana.

History
Sylvania was founded in 1836. A post office was established at Sylvania in 1850, and remained in operation until it was discontinued in 1905.

Geography

References

Unincorporated communities in Indiana
Unincorporated communities in Parke County, Indiana